Richard B. (Ricky) Rood is a professor of Climate and Space Sciences and Engineering (f/k/a Atmospheric, Oceanic and Space Sciences) at the University of Michigan in Ann Arbor. Prior to 2005, he held several leadership positions at NASA’s Goddard Space Flight Center.  He has more than 100 academic publications.

History
Rood has made contributions to several fields of research.  The numerical scheme he developed with Shian-Jiann Lin of the Geophysical Fluid Dynamics Laboratory is used in many atmospheric chemistry models and global climate models.  As the founding Head of the Data Assimilation Office, Rood was responsible for the first reanalysis dataset, GEOS-1.  The GEOS-1 data set in combination with the above-referenced numerical schemes became the foundation for GEOS-CHEM.

In 1999, Rood was detailed to the Office of Science and Technology Policy.  He was the lead author of an influential report on development of a federal strategy for the provision of climate-modeling products and high-performance computing capabilities.   He has contributed to many advisory reports and two National Research Council reports on climate modeling and computing.

Recently, Rood has worked at the intersection of climate change and society, both performing research and developing curriculum.  He was the climate change blogger for the Weather Underground (weather service) through early 2017, and his writings are widely reproduced on the web and cited in blogs and media outlets. In 2016 with Andrew Gettelmen, Rood published an open-access guide entitled Demystifying Climate Models.

Awards
Rood is a Fellow of the American Meteorological Society, and he holds the World Meteorological Organization's Norbert Gerbier Award.  He has been recognized with the NASA Exceptional Achievement Medal and NASA Outstanding Leadership Medal.

Selected publications
“An Assimilated Data Set for Earth Science Applications,” Schubert, S. D., Rood, R. B., and Pfaendtner, J., Bull Amer. Meteor. Soc., 74, 2331-2342, 1993. link to abstract

“Multidimensional Flux-Form Semi-Lagrangian Transport Schemes,” Lin, S.-J., and Rood, R. B., Mon. Wea. Rev., 124, 2046-2070, 1996. Link to Paper

“Climate Projections and their Impact on Policy and Practice,” Lemos, M. C. and Rood, R. B. Wiley Interdisciplinary Reviews: Climate Change, 1, 670-682, DOI: 10.1002/wcc.71, 2010. link to abstract

High-end Climate Science: Development of Modeling and Related Computing Capabilities, Richard B. Rood, Jeffery L. Anderson, David C. Bader, Maurice L. Blackmon, Timothy F. Hogan, and Patricia K. Esborg, available from US Global Change Research Program, 2000. Link to Paper

“Changing the Media Discussion on Climate and Extreme Weather,” Christine Shearer and Richard B. Rood, Earthzine, April 17, 2011 Link to Document

"To be the best in weather forecasting: Why Europe is beating the U.S." Richard B. Rood, Washington Post, March 8, 2013 Link to Document

References

External links
 Rood Michigan Web Page
 Rood ResearcherID
 Rood Google Scholar

American atmospheric scientists
American climatologists
University of Michigan faculty
Year of birth missing (living people)
Living people
Fellows of the American Meteorological Society